Liu Ping (born 8 November 1984) is a Chinese Paralympic sprinter who won gold medals in women's T35 100 metre and 200 metre sprints at the 2012 Summer Paralympics.

References

External links 
 

1984 births
Living people
Chinese female sprinters
Paralympic athletes of China
Paralympic gold medalists for China
Paralympic silver medalists for China
Athletes (track and field) at the 2012 Summer Paralympics
Medalists at the 2012 Summer Paralympics
World record holders in Paralympic athletics
Runners from Tianjin
Paralympic medalists in athletics (track and field)
21st-century Chinese women